Chiaucingo is a city in the Cualac municipality of the state of Guerrero in Mexico. With a population of 1,331 inhabitants, it is the second largest populated settlement in Cualac. In Chiaucingo, 53.76% of adults speak an indigenous language.

References

Populated places in Guerrero